Mount Olive is an unincorporated community in Fayette County, West Virginia, United States. The town itself has no ZIP code; however, Mount Olive Correctional Complex, West Virginia's maximum-security state prison, is located near the town and has a post office with ZIP code 25185.

References

Unincorporated communities in Fayette County, West Virginia
Unincorporated communities in West Virginia